The 2023 UMass Minutemen football team will represent the University of Massachusetts Amherst in the 2023 NCAA Division I FBS football season. They will play at Warren McGuirk Alumni Stadium. Their head coach is Don Brown.

References

UMass
UMass Minutemen football seasons
UMass Minutemen